Verschuren is a Dutch toponymic surname. The name is a contraction of van der schuren, meaning "from the barn(s)". Some variant forms are Verschueren, Verschure, Verschuur and Verschuuren.  Notable people with the surname include:

Annette Verschuren, Canadian businesswoman
Jan Verschuren (born 1962), Dutch organist
Kamiel Verschuren (born 1968), Dutch conceptual artist
Kees Verschuren (born 1941), Dutch sculptor and painter
 (1925–2000), Dutch Roman Catholic bishop of Helsinki
Peter Verschuren (born 1970s), Dutch mixed martial artist
Sebastiaan Verschuren (born 1988), Dutch swimmer

Verschuuren 
Gerard Verschuuren (born 1946), Dutch geneticist and philosopher

See also
Verschuren's swamp rat, rodent native to the Democratic Republic of the Congo

References

Dutch-language surnames
Toponymic surnames